Moora may refer to:
 Moora, Western Australia, townsite in Australia
 Moora, Estonia, village in Estonia
 Bog body called Moora, see Girl of the Uchter Moor
 Moora, surname
 Harri Moora (1900–1968), Estonian archaeologist

See also
 Moora Moora